Isla de Cedros Airport  is a small airfield located on Cedros Island—Isla de Cedros, in southwestern Baja California state, Mexico.

Cedros Island is the largest Mexican island in the Pacific Ocean.

Service
The Isla de Cedros Airport handles aviation for towns on the island, including:
 Cedros
 El Morro
 San Agustín
 La Colorada

Airlines and destinations

External links
 MMCD at Fallingrain.
 MMCD at Elite Jets.
 MMCD photo at Our Airports.

Cedros Island
Airports in Baja California
Transport in Ensenada Municipality